Mercy Health St. Rita's Medical Center is a large hospital serving a 70-mile radius of Lima, Ohio, United States.  It was started in 1918 by Sisters of Mercy, an order of Roman Catholic women founded by Catherine McAuley in Dublin, Ireland in 1831.

There are also separate facilities in Delphos, Bluffton, Glandorf and Wapakoneta that serve other parts of the region for rehabilitation, orthopedics and other medical services.

History
In 1918, the Sisters of Mercy opened a hospital in Lima, Ohio.

St. Rita's was the fulfillment of a dream of the Right Reverend Monsignor A.E. Manning, the Reverend William Tobin and Mother Bernardine McMullen, R.S.M. At the time of its opening, the hospital was not completely finished, but was opened in order to administer care to victims of one of the first and most devastating epidemics to plague the Lima area, the Spanish flu influenza pandemic of 1918.

Through the coming years, St. Rita's expanded to add more beds and services to meet the healthcare needs of the community. In 1948, a seven-story addition to the original building was completed which housed modern operating, delivery and X-ray rooms, more office space and an additional 150 beds. Just nine years later, it again became apparent that new facilities, additional beds, and a School of Nursing building would be needed to keep St. Rita's Hospital on the updated move to provide quality medical care for the people of Allen and surrounding counties.

After 59 years as St. Rita's Hospital, on March 9, 1977, the hospital name was changed to St. Rita's Medical Center.

In 2007, St. Rita's opened “The Medical Center of The Future.” The campus now looks more like a university campus stretching six blocks with covered walkways, ponds, water fountains, gardens and a track for walking and running.

Inside the Medical Center, additional space has been created to accommodate families whose involvement in the healing process is essential. The spacious rooms within the Medical Center not only provide a private and therapeutic environment for healing but also an aesthetic appeal with the presence of glass atriums, greenery, and decorative water details.

The corridors of the modern looking High Street Walkway lead patients to their physicians’ offices and to the new High Street Café and Courtyard Café.

The Henry & Beverly Hawk Heart Center expanded services in 2008 and became The Henry & Beverly Hawk Heart and Vascular Center and now offers vascular screening tests for blockages in the carotid artery, blockages in the legs from peripheral arterial disease and Aortic aneurysm, bulging of the main artery.

St. Rita's has, over the years, emphasized long range planning and keeping completely up-to-date not only with the most sophisticated pieces of equipment, but in medical procedures and services to the community.  In 2008, St. Rita's purchased Lima Allen County Paramedics (LACP) and operates the service of emergency/911 response, interfacility transfers, and Ambulette transports.

In 2018 St. Rita's Medical Center experienced a name change to its parent company's name, Mercy Health. Almost immediately after this change Mercy Health, Mercy Health St. Rita's Medical Center, and all other hospitals owned by Mercy Health were merged into a larger group from the east coast, Bon Secours. This merge has brought no changes to the hospital.

Mercy Health St. Rita's Medical Center is currently in the process of building an on-site education center with multiple classrooms and a 250-seat lecture hall. This expansion will focus on educating up and coming doctors.

Other facilities
The Mercy Health St. Rita's Medical Center provides other facilities across the region including two Urgent Care locations in Lima, Ohio and regional locations in Delphos, Glandorf, and Wapakoneta.

Lima urgent care
St. Rita's added St. Rita's Westside Luke's Urgent Care located at  2195 Allentown Road, Lima, OH 45905. Also St. Rita's Eastside Urgent Care, 967 Bellefontaine Avenue, Lima, OH 45804. West side Luke's Urgent care was shortened to Westside Urgent Care when the hospital was renamed.

Delphos
The Delphos  Ambulatory Care Center, located in Delphos, offers urgent care, outpatient services and specialty physician clinics to the people of Allen and Van Wert counties in Ohio.

The center accepts appointments for the following services or tests.

 cardiology
 gastroenterology
 OB/GYN
 orthopedics
 podiatry
 urology

Glandorf
The Putnam County Ambulatory Care Center located in Glandorf provides a 24-hour emergency care for patients in the Putnam County area who need immediate care, rather than being transported to Lima.

The following tests or services can be completed at the ambulatory care center for greater patient convenience.

 X-rays
 Mammography
 Computed tomography
 Electrocardiogram
 Bone density screenings
 Laboratory Tests
 Audiology Exams
 Ultrasound
 Magnetic resonance imaging
 Occupational Health Services
 Outpatient Nursing

Wapakoneta
Mercy Health St. Rita's Medical Center provides comprehensive rehabilitation services at the YMCA in Wapakoneta, which works with St. Rita's to provide the following rehabilitation services in Auglaize County.
 Physical Therapy
 Occupational Therapy
 Speech Therapy
 Aquatic Therapy
 Athletic Training
 Cardiac Rehabilitation
 Digital screening mammograms
 Free blood pressure
 Free bone density screening
 Multi-slice CT scanning
 Routine diagnostic, X-ray
 EKG services
 ABI, carotid, aorta & leg Ultrasound screening

References

External links
 

Hospital buildings completed in 1918
Hospital buildings completed in 1948
Catholic hospitals in North America
Hospitals in Ohio
Roman Catholic Diocese of Toledo
Buildings and structures in Lima, Ohio
Trauma centers